Anzoplanini is a tribe of land planarians in the subfamily Rhynchodeminae.

Description
The tribe Anzoplanini contains land planarians with dorsoventral testes, a condition that in land planarians is considered intermediate between a primitive ventral condition and a derivate dorsal condition. The mesenchymal musculature contains longitudinal fibers forming either a ventral plate or a ring around the intestine.

Genera
Currently, the tribe Anzoplanini comprises the following genera:

Anzoplana Winsor, 2006
 Marionfyfea Winsor, 2011 (replacement name for Fyfea Winsor, 2006, preoccupied)

References

Geoplanidae